Moritz Cohn (8 January 1844 – after 1907), also known by the pseudonym Conimor, was a Prussian-born playwright, poet, and novelist, as well as a prolific contributor to the press.

Cohn was born into a Jewish family in Kreuzburg, Silesia, and educated at the gymnasium of Brieg. He began life as a clerk in a merchant's office in Breslau, devoting his spare time to writing. He later worked at his brother's banking business in Görlitz, with whom he also participated in railroad construction.

After some of his plays had met with success, Cohn abandoned commerce and in 1875 settled down in Vienna as an author.

Publications

References
 

1844 births
19th-century Austrian dramatists and playwrights
19th-century Austrian Jews
19th-century Austrian male writers
19th-century Austrian novelists
19th-century Austrian poets
19th-century Prussian people
20th-century deaths
Austrian male dramatists and playwrights
Austrian male novelists
Austrian male poets
Austro-Hungarian Jews
Austro-Hungarian writers
Jewish Austrian writers
Jewish dramatists and playwrights
Jewish novelists
Jewish poets
People from Kluczbork
Silesian Jews
Year of death unknown